The Bridgham–Arch–Wilson Streets Historic District is a predominantly residential historic district in Providence, Rhode Island.  It is located southwest of downtown Providence, and was developed beginning in the 1840s as a suburban part of the city.  It is roughly in the shape of a boot, roughly bounded by Cranston, Bridgham, Elmwood, and Harrison Streets.  Most of the housing is architecturally reflective of the mid-19th century, with the Greek Revival, Italianate, and Second Empire styles well represented.  Development in the area slowed in the late 19th and early 20th centuries, so there are only a modest number of Queen Anne, Stick style, and Colonial Revival properties.  Most of the houses are either 1-1/2 or -story wood-frame structures, and are generally set on fairly small lots.  There are 175 primary buildings in the district, of which more than 150 are historically significant.

The district was added to the National Register of Historic Places in 1988.

See also

National Register of Historic Places listings in Providence, Rhode Island

References

Italianate architecture in Rhode Island
Greek Revival architecture in Rhode Island
History of Providence, Rhode Island
Historic districts in Providence County, Rhode Island
Geography of Providence, Rhode Island
Historic districts on the National Register of Historic Places in Rhode Island
National Register of Historic Places in Providence, Rhode Island